For other places with the same name, see Kazumba.

Kazumba is a location in the Tanganyika province, the Democratic Republic of the Congo.

Transport 

This town lies on the railway line to Lake Tanganyika.

See also 

 Railway stations in DRCongo

References 

Populated places in Tanganyika Province